The 2016–17 season was Lille OSC's 73rd season in existence and the club's 17th consecutive season in the top flight of French football.

This season Lille participated in the 2016–17 UEFA Europa League as a result of a 5th place finish in the 2015–16 Ligue 1.

Lille finished mid-table this season. New manager Riccardo del Silva could not help the team with results, but did not get sacked.

Players

Squad information
As of 30 August 2016

Appearances and goals

Last updated: 1 October 2016.
Source: Match reports in Competitive matches, Ligue1.com

Transfers

In

Loans in

Out

Loans out

Pre-season

Competitions

Ligue 1

League table

Results summary

Results by round

Matches

Coupe de France

Coupe de la Ligue

UEFA Europa League

Third qualifying round

References

Lille OSC seasons
Lille OSC